Brushy Creek is a stream in Bates and Henry counties in the U.S. state of Missouri. It is a tributary of Deepwater Creek.

Brushy Creek, also historically called "Brushy Branch" was so named on account of brush lining its course.

See also
List of rivers of Missouri

References

Rivers of Bates County, Missouri
Rivers of Henry County, Missouri
Rivers of Missouri